The Minister for Local Government is a minister in the New South Wales Government and has responsibilities which includes all local government areas and related legislation in New South Wales, the most primary of which is the Local Government Act 1993. The minister administers the portfolio through the Planning and Environment cluster, in particular through the Department of Planning and Environment, the Office of Local Government, and a range of other government agencies.

The Minister for Local Government is Wendy Tuckerman, since 21 December 2021. The minister works within the cluster, and assists the senior cluster minister, the Minister for Planning, currently Anthony Roberts, also since 21 December 2021. Ultimately both ministers are responsible to the Parliament of New South Wales.

Administrative history
With the significant expansion of Local Government areas in the early 1900s the first formal government body with the specific responsibility for Local Government was established by the Local Government (Shires) Act, 1905, which created the "Local Government Branch" of the Public Works Department on 9 December 1905. On 5 January 1906 the Secretary for Public Works was charged with its administration. On 15 March 1915 the Local Government Branch was made independent as the "Department of Local Government" and the process of its full establishment culminated with the appointment of the first Minister for Local Government on 15 November 1916, John Daniel FitzGerald. Fitzgerald was responsible for steering through the first major piece of legislation dealing with local government regulations and powers in the Local Government Act 1919. The new Act provided for the establishment of County Councils to enable Municipalities and Shires to combine for the carrying out of large works that affected more than one district, most prominently in the area of electricity supply, with the Sydney County Council being a prime example.

In February 1936 the department merged with the Public Works department to become the "Department of Works and Local Government". On 2 June 1941, this short-lived department was abolished and "Department of Local Government and Housing" succeeded it. The then Minister for Local Government and Housing took on responsibilities for social housing in the state. This body then became the Department of Local Government again on 8 June 1944. In 1948 the new Minister Joseph Cahill was responsible for moving the most significant reform to local government since 1919 when he passed through the Local Government (Areas) Act 1948, which placed the City of Sydney within the regulations of the 1919 act (by repealing the Sydney Corporations Act 1932) and entailed large-scale amalgamations of local councils in Sydney.

On 6 November 1981 the department was abolished and replaced by the "Local Government Office" of the Department of Local Government and Lands. On 29 February 1984 a new Department of Local Government replaced the functions of the Office of Local Government. This Department of Local Government was amalgamated with the Registry of Co-operatives on 1 July 1991 to create the Department of Local Government and Co-operatives headed by the Minister for Local Government and Co-operatives. The second minister of this title, Garry West, was responsible for the passing of the Local Government Act 1993, which repealed the 1919 act, modernised the controls and powers of Local Government and formalised the command structure with the Minister at its head. This continues to be the main piece of legislation operated by the Minister today. On 6 April 1995 the responsibility for co-operatives was transferred to the Department of Consumer Affairs.

On 1 July 2009 the Department of Local Government was abolished and its functions were transferred to the Department of Premier and Cabinet as the Office of Local Government. In 2011 these functions were moved to the Department of Planning and Environment. Following the 2019 state election, the Office of Local Government was abolished and its functions, together with a broad range of other functions were transferred to the newly formed Department of Planning and Industry.

Ministerial powers
The minister has significant powers to regulate and control the operations of local governments. Currently, under section 255 of the Local Government Act 1993, the Minister has the power initiate investigations or a public inquiry into the behaviours of councillors and council staff and, if the findings are against the council's ability to operate within the law or public expectations, the minister can then recommend to the Governor for dismissal of the council. Prominent examples of this occurring under the 1993 Act and previous Acts include:

List of ministers

Local government

Former ministerial titles

Assistant ministers

See also 

List of New South Wales government agencies

References

External links 
Office of Local Government
LOCAL GOVERNMENT ACT 1993

Local government areas of New South Wales
Local Government